Piringsdorf is a town in the district of Oberpullendorf in the Austrian state of Burgenland.

Population

Twin towns
Piringsdorf is twinned with:

  Meyrieu-les-Étangs, France, since 1999

References

Cities and towns in Oberpullendorf District